Cicognolo is a comune (municipality) in the Province of Cremona in the Italian region Lombardy, located about  southeast of Milan and about  northeast of Cremona.

Cicognolo borders the following municipalities: Cappella de' Picenardi, Pescarolo ed Uniti, Pieve San Giacomo, Vescovato.

Demographic evolution

References

Cities and towns in Lombardy